Eneas Energy AS is a Norwegian energy company which was founded in 1995. The company was one of the 100 largest in the county of Buskerud. The privately owned company operates in Norway and Sweden and employs 260. The company's main office is located in Drammen, it also has offices in Trondheim and Strängnäs. The company name Eneas was coined in 2005 when Norsk Energirevisjon AS and Encom AS merged. It has contributed with funding for the local cultural life and sporting organizations such as Bellona, Strømsgodset Band and other sporting clubs.

History 
Eneas Energy was founded in 1995 by Thomas Hakavik, Olav Sølverud and Bjørn-Aksel Hjelmtvedt, under the name Norsk Energirevisjon AS (NERAS). The company dealt solely in energy auditing its first year. In 1996, NERAS established Encom AS, a company that introduced an electricity metering service for commercial buildings. In 1998, NERAS developed energy optimizing services and their first Energy Performance Contracting (EPC) project was signed.

NERAS expanded into Sweden in 1999 and established an office in Gothenburg to serve the Swedish commercial market with energy auditing services. The same year, they opened the call-center NERAS Direkte AS in Trondheim to sell their internal and external services via telemarketing. NERAS later moved the Swedish head office from Gothenburg to Strängnäs in 2006.

In 2001, the founders sold 50% of the company to Statoil. The 50-50 ownership continued for five years until 2005 when management bought out Statoil ASA and opened the door for strategic investors with backgrounds from industry (mainly from Orkla ASA) and large-scale real estate. The employees now owned approximately 30% of the company and the new ownership brought about the merger between NERAS and Encom, thus resulting in Eneas Energy AS.

As a product of the merger they created Samköp av El in 2006 and established Neras Direkt AB with TM business from the Swedish city of Hackås, their business concentrated more on the internal services. The company later moved to the Swedish city of Östersund.

Looking to increase focus on ENØK and expertise on building automation, Eneas Energy bought Intent AS I 2007. At the same time, they established a power management environment by founding Powertrade I Norway and Sweden. Powertrade was sold in its entirety to Ringeriks-Kraft AS after three years.

In 2009, Eneas Energy bought up EnergiCompaniet AS to supplement their growing expertise in ENØK and project management. Now both EngergiCompaniet and Intent have merged with Eneas Energy AS. In 2009, Eneas Energy also established a strategy to gain ground in Germany. They purchased Nord Energie GmbH in Berlin and transferred their power management services to a collaboration with a German telemarketing agency. After the buy-out, the name was changed to Eneas Energy GmbH and the company has since expanded its product line to include energy auditing services. Business in Germany was shut down during the summer of 2012.

In September 2010, London-based Palamon Capital Partners Ltd bought up 80% of Eneas Energy AS, making them the largest shareholder. The employees owned the remaining 20% of the shares. On January 3, 2012, after 17 years of leading the company, Thomas Hakavik handed over his role as CEO to Andrè Løvestam and took on the position of Director of Development. This did not last long as Løvestram resigned from CEO in the summer of 2013 and Hakavik was back at the reins as CEO.

In November 2010, Eneas Energy started a new focus area – insurance brokerage, and on June 15, 2011, the Norwegian Ministry of Finance approved the entity Eneas Broker as a cross-border insurance provider able to operate in both Norway and Sweden.

References

External links 

 Official website  – Eneas Group
 Official website – Eneas Energy Norway
 Official website – Eneas Energy Sweden
 Official website – Neras Direkte Norway
 Official website – Costsavers Norway
 Official website – Costsavers Sweden

Energy companies of Norway
Companies based in Drammen
Energy companies established in 1995